The Ingeniero Ballester Dam is a dam on the Neuquén River, in the Argentine Patagonia. The top of the dam doubles as a road bridge.

Completed in 1916, the dam is used to re-route part of the flow of the Neuquén River to a long irrigation canal which flows east and then southeast passing by the cities of Barda del Medio, Cinco Saltos, Cipolletti, Allen, General Roca, Ingeniero Luis A. Huergo, and Villa Regina, and then emptying into the flood plain of the Río Negro. A second derivation dam, downstream on the canal, sends water to feed the reservoir of the Pellegrini Lake.

National Route 151 crosses over it from Río Negro to the province of Neuquén.

Bridges in Argentina
Dams in Argentina
Buildings and structures in Río Negro Province
Buildings and structures in Neuquén Province
Dams completed in 1916